Mark Fisher (born 29 October 1944) is a British Labour Party politician. He was the Member of Parliament (MP) for Stoke-on-Trent Central from 1983 to 2010 and Minister for the Arts between 1997 and 1998.

Early life
Mark Fisher is the son of Sir Nigel Fisher, the former Conservative MP for Surbiton and Lady Gloria Vaughan, daughter of the 7th Earl of Lisburne. He is the stepson of Ulster Unionist MP Patricia Ford, and thus the brother-in-law of Conservative MP Sir Michael Grylls and uncle of explorer Bear Grylls.

After the retirement of Tam Dalyell in 2005, Fisher became the only Labour MP to have been educated at Eton College. He read English Literature at Trinity College, Cambridge. After completing his education in 1966, he became a film producer and screenwriter, but in 1975 Fisher became the principal of the Tattenhall Centre of Education in Cheshire, where he remained until his election to Westminster.

Before leaving university, Fisher had numerous low-paying jobs, including: working in a Cyril Lord carpet factory in Northern Ireland, as a waiter, as a kitchen porter, as a caddie on a golf course, insulating roofs, on a travelling fairground and as a folk singer and guitarist.

His film work consisted of writing screenplays for Harry Saltzman and two stage plays: in 1974 for the new Arts Council Horseshoe Theatre in Basingstoke and, in 1988, for the Theatre Upstairs, at the Royal Court in London.

Political career
Fisher unsuccessfully contested Leek at the 1979 general election but was defeated by David Knox by 10,571 votes. He was elected as a councillor to the Staffordshire County Council in 1981 and remained a councillor until he stood down in 1985.

He was elected as an MP for Stoke-on-Trent Central at the 1983 general election following the retirement of the sitting Labour MP Robert Cant. Fisher held the seat with a majority of 8,250.

In parliament, Fisher served on the Treasury Select committee for three years from 1983. In 1985 he was appointed as an Opposition Whip by Neil Kinnock for a year in 1985. Following the 1987 General Election he became the opposition spokesman on arts and media and following the 1992 general election he became the spokesman on the Citizen's Charter, a year later in 1993, however, he was back as a spokesman at the newly named Department of National Heritage. In 1992 he introduced the "Right to Know Bill", a Private member's bill, which, though unsuccessful, became the forerunner of the Freedom of Information Bill.

After the Labour victory at the 1997 general Election, new prime minister Tony Blair appointed Fisher as the Parliamentary Under Secretary of State at the Department for Culture, Media and Sport. He rebelled against the government by voting against the party whip on the Competition Act 1998, and was later sacked in Blair's first cabinet reshuffle in 1998, after which Fisher returned to the backbenches.

He has served as the Patron for the National Benevolent Fund for the Aged since 1986, and was a member of the BBC General Advisory Council for ten years from 1987. He also served as a council member of the Institute for Policy Studies 1985–95, and was the deputy Pro-Chancellor of Keele University from 1989 until his entry to government in 1997. In 2000 he was a visiting fellow at St Antony's College, Oxford.

In June 2009, Fisher called on Prime Minister Gordon Brown to resign. In the expenses scandal he claimed over £17,000, none of which he was required to pay back. The bulk of this sum was spent on mortgage and utility payments on his second home. Some of his more bizarre expenses claims include a 34 pence Kit Kat bar, a bottle of Toilet Duck and a pack of chunky crayons and face painting kit.

On 10 March 2010, Fisher announced that he would stand down as an MP due to health concerns, citing hydrocephalus. He was succeeded as MP for Stoke-on-Trent Central by Tristram Hunt, who was also educated at Trinity College, Cambridge.

Political views
On 31 October 2006, Fisher was one of 12 Labour MPs to back Plaid Cymru and the Scottish National Party's call for an inquiry into the Iraq War.

He opposed foundation hospitals and the Trident  system, voting against these issues in the House of Commons. He also opposed the 42-day detention without charge policy and the 10p tax.

Fisher believes that Parliament has become too much of a rubber stamp for government policy. He chaired the "Parliament First" group, which seeks to restore the balance of power to Parliament.

His particular interest of the arts led him to criticize the Blair administration for what he called its obsession with "popular music, youth culture and new technologies" and "art created for and by young people"; instead he wished for a more "balanced" cultural policy.

Personal life
Fisher married Ingrid Geech Hunt in 1971 and fathered two children, Rhydian Fisher, CEO of Gambling Games for the Poor, and the actress India Fisher, as well as taking over the upbringing of Hunt's two children by her previous marriage, the musician Crispin Hunt and the actress Francesca Hunt. The couple divorced in 1999. He lived briefly with Candia McWilliam.

Fisher has lived in the Stoke-on-Trent district of Hartshill since first running for Parliament.

Fisher refused the offer of a peerage ahead of the 2001 General Election.

Fisher's 2004 book Britain's Best Museums and Galleries listed what were, in his opinion, the 350 best museums in the country.

In October 2009, it was revealed that Fisher received an annual fee of £67,000 from the Doha-based Qatar Museums Authority for providing "advice on the development of the museums authority's plans", attending three board meetings a year.

Bibliography
1974: Brave New Town (play)
1988: City Centres, City Cultures
1990: The Cutting Room (play)
1991: Whose Cities? (with Ursula Owen), Penguin Books
1992: A New London (with Richard Rogers), Penguin Books; 
2004: Britain's Best Museums and Galleries, Allen Lane;

References

External links

Voting Record publicwhip.org.uk
Profile at theyworkforyou.com
BBC Politics Profile

1944 births
Living people
Alumni of Trinity College, Cambridge
English film producers
English non-fiction writers
English screenwriters
English male screenwriters
Fellows of St Antony's College, Oxford
Labour Party (UK) MPs for English constituencies
Members of Staffordshire County Council
People educated at Eton College
People associated with Keele University
People from Hartshill
People from Woking
Schoolteachers from Cheshire
UK MPs 1983–1987
UK MPs 1987–1992
UK MPs 1992–1997
UK MPs 1997–2001
UK MPs 2001–2005
UK MPs 2005–2010
People with hydrocephalus
English male non-fiction writers
Politicians from Staffordshire